The 2005 FIA WTCC Race Of Mexico was the fifth round of the 2005 World Touring Car Championship season. It was held at the Autódromo Miguel E. Abed. Fabrizio Giovanardi won the first race from pole position for Alfa Romeo, and Peter Terting took his first and only WTCC win in the second race, which also turned out to be SEAT's second win.

Report

Qualifying
Roberto Colciago took a shock pole position driving for Honda with a time of 1:29.830, with Peter Terting's SEAT very close behind. Fabrizio Giovanardi qualified third for Alfa Romeo, leading an Alfa quartet of Augusto Farfus, James Thompson and Gabriele Tarquini. However, Colciago, Terting and Farfus all had ten-place grid penalties for incidents in Imola and an engine change. The biggest shock in qualifying was that none of the factory BMWs qualified in the top ten. The first BMW was Antonio García in 11th, with reigning champion Andy Priaulx only 15th but still a spot ahead of championship leader Dirk Müller. Jörg Müller crashed heavily in practice and did not take part after that in the weekend due to a heavily damaged car.

Race 1
Roberto Colciago, Peter Terting and Augusto Farfus, who qualified on pole, 2nd and 4th respectively all suffered ten-place grid penalties, Terting for  an engine change and the other two for dangerous driving in the previous race at Imola. Alfa Romeo, despite Farfus's penalty gratefully accepted that as their drivers Fabrizio Giovanardi, James Thompson and Gabriele Tarquini to start at the front. They maintained their positions early on, with Giovanardi leading Thompson and Tarquini, with Jordi Gené and Rickard Rydell following them in two SEATS, and Antonio García keeping BMW in the points. Gené crashed out on the second lap, leaving the three Alfas with a large 4.5 second gap after just 2 laps. Thompson stayed with Giovanardi in the early stages, however he lost pace as the race progressed, and was passed by Tarquini on lap 5. Thompson then had the rest of the pack close up on him, whereas Giovanardi and Tarquini continued to drive away at a rate of knots. Meanwhile, Roberto Colciago was on a charge after his penalty, jumping up from 11th to 5th after 3 laps. He then passed Rydell for fourth and was attacking third-placed Thompson when his gearbox broke and he had to retire. Robert Huff was in the points for Chevrolet, and a late race pass on Peter Terting put him up to a sensational 6th, and on the last lap Rydell passed Thompson to take third. Giovanardi took his second win in two weekends, with teammate Tarquini close behind. Rydell completed the podium, a massive 11 seconds behind, with Thompson, García, Huff, Terting and Tom Coronel, the latter of whom won the Independent's Trophy. Dirk Müller and Andy Priaulx, first and second in the championship finished well out of the points in their BMWs.

Race 2
Independent driver Tom Coronel started on pole after finishing eighth in Race 1, however it was Peter Terting who took the lead at the start followed by García. Coronel, Thompson, Huff, Rydell, Giovanardi and Jason Plato in a factory SEAT completed the top 8, whereas Tarquini and Alex Zanardi's BMW collided, taking both out of the race. The front two started to pull away but Thompson soon got up to third and joined in, and his teammate Giovanardi passed Rydell and Huff on lap 2 before passing Coronel a lap later to get 4th; however he was 4 seconds behind the top three. Terting led with García and Thompson close behind, until an overtaking attempt by Thompson on García saw them bang wheels and go off the track, with García still rejoining second, but having lost time to Terting, while Thompson lost a place to Giovanardi.

Classification

Race 1

Race 2

Standings after the races

Drivers' Championship standings

Manufacturers' Championship standings

References

External links 

Mexico